This is a list of books about polyhedra.

Polyhedral models

Cut-out kits
 Advanced Polyhedra 1: The Final Stellation, . Advanced Polyhedra 2: The Sixth Stellation, . Advanced Polyhedra 3: The Compound of Five Cubes, .
 More Mathematical Curiosities, Tarquin, . Make Shapes 1, . Make Shapes 2, .
 Cut and Assemble 3-D Star Shapes, 1997. Easy-To-Make 3D Shapes in Full Color, 2000.

Origami

 Multimodular Origami Polyhedra: Archimedeans, Buckyballs and Duality, 2002. Beginner's Book of Modular Origami Polyhedra: The Platonic Solids, 2008. Modular Origami Polyhedra, also with Lewis Simon, 2nd ed., 1999.

 A Plethora of Polyhedra in Origami, Dover, 2002.

Other model-making
 2nd ed., 1961. 3rd ed., Tarquin, 1981, .

 2nd ed., Polyhedron Models for the Classroom, 1974. Spherical Models, 1979. Dual Models, 1983.

Mathematical studies

Introductory level and general audience

 Dover, 1991.

 Translated into English as An Adventure in Multidimensional Space: The Art and Geometry of Polygons, Polyhedra, and Polytopes, Wiley, 1986, and into German as Polyeder und Kosmos: Spuren einer mehrdimensionalen Welt, Vieweg, 1987.

Textbooks
 Translated from 1950 Russian edition.
 2nd ed., 2015, .

 2nd ed., Macmillan, 1963. 3rd ed., Dover, 1973.

 2nd ed., Springer, 2003.
 Translated into English as Convex Figures and Polyhedra by T. Jefferson Smith, Dover, 1963 and by Donald L. Barnett, Heath, 1966.

Monographs and special topics
 2nd ed., Springer, 1982. 3rd ed., Tarquin, 1999.
 2nd ed., 1991.

 2nd ed., 1980.
 2nd ed., 2005.

 Translated and corrected from

Edited volumes

 2nd ed., Shaping Space: Exploring Polyhedra in Nature, Art, and the Geometrical Imagination, Springer, 2013.

History

Early works
Listed in chronological order, and including some works shorter than book length:

 Translated into English as Harmonies of the World by C. G. Wallis (1939).
 Original manuscript lost; copy by Gottfried Wilhelm Leibniz reprinted and translated in Descartes on Polyhedra, Springer, 1982.

 Reprint, Tarquin, 2007, .

 Über die gleicheckig-gleichflächigen diskontinuierlichen und nichtkonvexen Polyeder, 1906.

Books about historical topics

References

Polyhedra
Polyhedra
Mathematics books